Rethymnian Brewery is a microbrewery situated near Armeni, Rethymno, Crete, Greece.

The company produces two types of beer using traditional organic methods and according to the German Reinheitsgebot of 1516. The hops are imported from Germany, biologically brewed, and the result is either a Rethymnian Blonde or Rethymnian Dark (both 4.8% ABV).

The beer is bottled in 0.33lt swing-top bottles.

External links 
 RateBeer

Beer in Greece
Breweries in Greece